Bon Viatge is a Trambaix station located in Sant Joan Despí, to the west of Barcelona. This stop includes two of the three Trambaix routes (T1 and T2). It is named after the main street in Sant Joan Despí's old town (Barri Centre in Catalan).

Rail services

External links
Information and photos of the station at trenscat.cat

Trambaix stops
Transport in Baix Llobregat